Rafael Segundo Sotomayor Gaete (November 16, 1848 – February 16, 1918) was a Chilean politician and several times minister.

He was born in Cauquenes, the son of Rafael Sotomayor Baeza and of Pabla del Carmen Gaete Ruiz.  He studied at the Instituto Nacional and later graduated as a lawyer from the Universidad de Chile on January 7, 1871. During the War of the Pacific, he accompanied his father, who was the Minister of War, as personal secretary and auditor, and after his death, in 1880, he became CO of the Customs House Guard in Iquique and later Intendant of Tarapacá. On May 4, 1895, he married  Inés Neuhaus Ugarteche, and together they had 6 children.

He joined the Radical Party, and in 1898 President Federico Errázuriz Echaurren appointed him Minister of Finance (1898–1899) first and Minister of the Interior later (1899). President German Riesco appointed him Minister of the Interior (1903) and then Minister of Foreign Affairs, Cult and Colonization (1903–1904). In 1906 Sotomayor was elected Senator for "Aconcagua" (1906–1912).

President Pedro Montt appointed him Minister of Finance (1906–1907) and then Minister of the Interior (1907–1908). As such he is held responsible of giving the shoot-to-kill order to General Roberto Silva Renard that caused the Santa María School massacre in 1907, where the estimates range between 1,100 and 3,500 men, women and children killed. His reputation never recovered.

Sotomayor died of Spanish flu very early on in the pandemic. He had been on board the ship Infanta Isabel, in front of Pernambuco, at the age of 69, on the return trip from Europe, after having been Chilean Ambassador to France.

External links
Genealogical chart 
Genealogical chart of Sotomayor family 

1848 births
1918 deaths
People from Cauquenes
Chilean people of Galician descent
Radical Party of Chile politicians
Chilean Ministers of the Interior
Foreign ministers of Chile
Chilean Ministers of Finance
Members of the Chamber of Deputies of Chile
Members of the Senate of Chile
Ambassadors of Chile to France
Instituto Nacional General José Miguel Carrera alumni
University of Chile alumni
Deaths from Spanish flu